Jussieu can refer to:

 Antoine Laurent de Jussieu (1748–1836), French botanist
 Antoine de Jussieu (1686–1758), French naturalist, uncle of A. L. de Jussieu.
 Bernard de Jussieu (1699–1777), French naturalist, uncle of A. L. de Jussieu.
 Adrien-Henri de Jussieu (1797–1853), French botanist, son of A. L. de Jussieu.
 See De Jussieu for additional family members
 Jussieu Campus, Paris, France
 Jussieu station of the Paris Métro
Jussieu Peninsula, a peninsula in South Australia